Hoya retusa is a species of flowering plant in the genus Hoya native to India and the eastern Himalayas. It is an epiphyte. The plant's specific epithet retusa refers to the shape, with retuse meaning it has a rounded leaf apex with a notch. It grows in a trailing habit and the foliage is succulent.

References

retusa
Taxa named by Rafaël Govaerts
Plants described in 1852